Garba Lawal (born 22 May 1974) is a Nigerian former professional footballer who played as a left midfielder. In 2014 he became general manager at Kaduna United and left his role in 2015. He is with the technical department of the Nigeria Football Federation.

Club career
As a player, Lawal had his most successful time at Roda JC in the Eredivisie. He also played for Julius Berger F.C. in Nigeria and Chinese side Changsha Ginde.

In August 2009, he announced his return as a player-coach for Makurdi side Lobi Stars, He was named General Manager of Kaduna United in February 2014.

International career
Lawal is regarded as one of the most versatile players in the Nigeria national team of the 1990s and early 2000s often being used for any position ranging from defence to attack on the left wing. Lawal took part at the FIFA World Cups in 1998, where he played a key role in the 3–2 win over Spain in Nigeria's first match of the tournament, and in 2002. He won the Olympic gold medal in 1996. He represented Nigeria at four editions of African Cup of Nations: 2000, 2002, 2004 and 2006, scoring in all but the first.

Post-playing career
In August 2009, Lawal was named as the assistant coach of Lobi Stars F.C. In the same year, he was employed as team coordinator for the Nigeria U17 national team.

In February 2014 he was appointed general manager at Kaduna United.

Honours
Roda JC
KNVB Cup: 1996–97, 1999–2000

Levski Sofia
Bulgarian Cup: 2002–03

References

1974 births
Living people
Nigerian footballers
Association football midfielders
Nigeria international footballers
Olympic footballers of Nigeria
Olympic gold medalists for Nigeria
Footballers at the 1996 Summer Olympics
Footballers at the 2000 Summer Olympics
Olympic medalists in football
Medalists at the 1996 Summer Olympics
1998 FIFA World Cup players
2000 African Cup of Nations players
2002 FIFA World Cup players
2002 African Cup of Nations players
2004 African Cup of Nations players
2006 Africa Cup of Nations players
Tunisian Ligue Professionnelle 1 players
Eredivisie players
First Professional Football League (Bulgaria) players
Liga Portugal 2 players
Allsvenskan players
Chinese Super League players
Super League Greece players
C.D. Santa Clara players
Changsha Ginde players
Espérance Sportive de Tunis players
IF Elfsborg players
Iraklis Thessaloniki F.C. players
Bridge F.C. players
Lobi Stars F.C. players
PFC Levski Sofia players
Roda JC Kerkrade players
Nigerian football managers
Lobi Stars F.C. managers
Nigerian expatriate footballers
Nigerian expatriate sportspeople in Tunisia
Expatriate footballers in Tunisia
Nigerian expatriate sportspeople in the Netherlands
Expatriate footballers in the Netherlands
Nigerian expatriate sportspeople in Bulgaria
Expatriate footballers in Bulgaria
Nigerian expatriate sportspeople in Sweden
Expatriate footballers in Sweden
Nigerian expatriate sportspeople in Portugal
Expatriate footballers in Portugal
Nigerian expatriate sportspeople in Greece
Expatriate footballers in Greece
Nigerian expatriate sportspeople in China
Expatriate footballers in China
Sportspeople from Kaduna